Michelle Louise Stevens (formerly Beaumont and Barnes) is a fictional character who appeared in the last seasons of the popular American television series Dallas, played by Kimberly Foster from 1989 to 1991.

Character
In an interview for the Reading Eagle, Kimberly Foster described her character, saying "Michelle doesn't have a limit on how far she'll go... She's very smart and devious and conniving. She lies, too, but I think still she has some vulnerabilities. She's always trying to find out everyone else's businesses, but she has secrets going on with just about everybody, too. She has some pain in her heart. I think it's because she grew up in the shadow of her sister".

Storylines
Michelle, the scheming younger sister of April Stevens, comes to Dallas envious of her rich older sister's lifestyle. She initially becomes entangled with Cliff Barnes, and spies on him for J.R. Ewing. J.R. grows to dislike Michelle after she interferes with his marriage with Cally. When Michelle begins an affair with J.R.'s son, James Beaumont, J.R. arranges for Michelle to leave town.

Following April's death, Michelle returns to Dallas bent on revenge. After inheriting April's wealth, she buys Ewing Oil from LeeAnn De La Vega (played by Barbara Eden) and marries James Beaumont, much to J.R.'s displeasure. Michelle's marriage is short-lived as she later learns that James is already married to someone else. After James tells her he's leaving town with his wife and child, Michelle sells half of Ewing Oil to Cliff Barnes, but he takes advantage of Michelle's drunken state and marries her in order to control all of Ewing Oil. Michelle is jailed for shooting and killing Hillary Taylor, the woman responsible for April's death. Michelle is released after J.R. offers to persuade the district attorney's office to drop the charges. In exchange for his help, Michelle sells her half of Ewing Oil back to J.R., making him an equal business partner with Cliff.

After returning from jail, Michelle is last seen returning to Ray Krebbs' old ranch on Southfork Ranch, which she had purchased with the hope of starting a family home with James. Upon returning, she breaks down in tears since the house is empty.

Notes

References

External links

Dallas (TV franchise) characters
Television characters introduced in 1989